The 2009 Tour Down Under was the 11th edition of the Tour Down Under cycling stage race, taking place over 20–25 January in and around Adelaide, South Australia. The Tour Down Under was the first race outside Europe to be given ProTour status by the UCI, and this edition was the first race in the inaugural UCI World Ranking calendar.

This was the first race in Lance Armstrong's comeback.

The race was preceded by an opening race called Down Under Classic, not part of the UCI ProTour competition.

Stage results

Stage 1, 20 January, Norwood – Mawson Lakes, 140 km

Stage 2, 21 January, Hahndorf – Stirling, 145 km

Stage 3, 22 January, Unley – Victor Harbor, 136 km

Stage 4, 23 January, Burnside Village – Angaston, 143 km

Stage 5, 24 January, Snapper Point – Willunga, 148 km

Stage 6, 25 January, Adelaide City Council Circuit, 90 km

Final standing

General classification

Mountains classification

Points classification

Young classification

Team classification

Classification leadership

Individual 2009 UCI World Rankings standings after race 

Per the first published individual classification.

Teams 

The Australian national team called Team UniSA–Australia was the only non-UCI ProTour team invited to the race.

References

External links
2009 Tour Down Under Official Website

2009
2009 UCI ProTour
2009 in Australian sport
2009 in Oceanian sport
2009 UCI World Ranking
January 2009 sports events in Australia